The Caribbean Suite is the second album led by American saxophonist Harold Vick recorded in 1966 and released on the RCA Victor label. The disc features Kenny Graham's eight-part "Caribbean Suite".

Reception
The Allmusic review by Ken Dryden awarded the album 4 stars and stated "Harold Vick led relatively few record dates of his own, but this little-known session is one of his better efforts".

Track listing
All compositions by Kenny Graham except as indicated
 "Mango Walk" - 4:29
 "Saga Boy" - 1:55
 "Bongo Chant" - 4:59
 "Dance of the Zombies" - 4:30
 "Wha' Hupp'n?" - 5:38
 "Tiempo Medio Lento" - 3:29 		
 "Beguine" - 3:22 		
 "Haitian Ritual" - 3:04 		
 "Barbados" (Charlie Parker) - 2:53
 "Jamaica Farewell" (Lord Burgess) - 3:09
 "Letitia" (Harold Vick) - 5:24

Personnel
Harold Vick - tenor saxophone, soprano saxophone, flute
Blue Mitchell - trumpet
Bobby Hutcherson - vibraphone
Albert Dailey - piano 
Everett Barksdale - guitar
Walter Booker - bass
Mickey Roker - drums
Montego Joe, Manuel Ramos - Latin percussion

References

RCA Records albums
Harold Vick albums
1967 albums